The Goethe-Oberlyzeum was a girls' gymnasium in Königsberg, Germany, named in honor of the writer Johann Wolfgang von Goethe.

History

In 1913 a women's teaching institute (Lehrerinnenbildungsanstalt) was converted into a gymnasium. Fritz Gause began lecturing there in 1922. The school, which was located on Friedrichstraße in Neue Sorge, was acquired by the city of Königsberg in 1925. Its directors included Bruno Dannenbaum and Richard Scheibe. The building survived Bombing of Königsberg in World War II and was razed in January 2018, under protest from presidential candidate  Ksenia Sobchak and other conservationists,  in Kaliningrad, Russia.

Notes

References

1913 establishments in Germany
1945 disestablishments in Germany
Buildings and structures in Kaliningrad
Education in Königsberg
Educational institutions established in 1913
Educational institutions disestablished in 1945
Former buildings and structures in Königsberg
Girls' schools in Germany
Gymnasiums in Germany